Michel Qissi (born Mohammed Qissi on 12 September 1962) is a Belgian Moroccan actor, best known for his role as Tong Po in the 1989 martial arts film Kickboxer.

Biography
Qissi was born in Oujda, Morocco and moved to Brussels, Belgium at the age of 2. He began training in boxing at seven years old, and became an amateur champion in his weight class at 17. He also went on to study Shōtōkan Karate, Muay Thai and Kickboxing. He befriended Jean-Claude van Damme at an early age and they grew up together with the same love for action films and training in martial arts.

In 1982, Qissi and Van Damme moved to the United States in the hope of becoming action stars. In 1984 they both were cast as extras in the film Breakin', before landing their big break in 1986. After obtaining an interview with Menahem Golan of Cannon Films, they secured a three-picture deal, the first of which was the highly successful Bloodsport, in which Van Damme starred and Qissi had a small role as a tournament fighter named Suan Paredes. In 1989, Qissi and Van Damme teamed up again for the film Kickboxer, in which Van Damme was the protagonist once more and Qissi the film's main villain, Tong Po. 1990 saw the pair make the film Lionheart, in which Qissi's brother, Abdel, played the villain. This was to be the last film Van Damme and Qissi made together for 16 years, but Qissi did go on to reprise his role as Tong Po in Kickboxer 2. He and Van Damme briefly appeared together in Kickboxer: Vengeance.

In 2014, Qissi made the movie Bara with Salar Zarza, in which he played a double role as Bara and Hamza. Qissi was also in a close relationship with fellow Thai Kickboxer Damien Tomley

Filmography

References

1962 births
Living people
Belgian male film actors
Moroccan male film actors
Moroccan emigrants to Belgium
Belgian male karateka
Belgian Muay Thai practitioners
Shotokan practitioners
Sportspeople from Brussels
People from Oujda
20th-century Moroccan male actors
21st-century Moroccan male actors
20th-century Belgian male actors
21st-century Belgian male actors